Ernest Thomas  may refer to:

Ernest Lee Thomas, American actor
Ernest Thomas (Groveland Four) of the "Groveland Four" who were accused of rape in 1949
Sgt. Ernest Ivy Thomas, Jr., U.S. Marine, recipient of the Navy Cross